Nahs or NAHS may refer to:
 Naḥš, a hypothetical Proto-Canaanite originator of the Semitic letter Nun
 National Art Honor Society, an American high school honor society
 New American High Schools, an initiative of the United States Department of Education
 Sodium hydrosulfide (NaHS)

Schools 
 Nazareth Academy High School, Philadelphia, Pennsylvania, United States
 New Albany High School (disambiguation)
 North Adams High School, Seaman, Ohio, United States
 North Andover High School, North Andover, Massachusetts, United States
 North Arlington High School, North Arlington, New Jersey, United States
 North Atlanta High School, Atlanta, Georgia, United States
 North Augusta High School, North Augusta, South Carolina, United States
 Nurnberg American High School, a closed United States Department of Defense Dependents Schools (DoDDS) system school in Nurnberg, Germany